List of gymnasts who specialize in the stationary rings event:
 Albert Azaryan, Olympic gold medalist at the 1956 Summer Olympics and at the 1960 Summer Olympics
 Arthur Zanetti, Olympic gold medalist at the 2012 Summer Olympics
 Chen Yibing, Olympic gold medalist at the 2008 Summer Olympics
 Eleftherios Petrounias, Olympic gold medalist at the 2016 Summer Olympics
 Jury Chechi, Olympic gold medalist at the 1996 Summer Olympics
 Yordan Yovchev
 Yuri van Gelder

Rings